Martin Čechman (born 20 October 1998) is a Czech racing cyclist. He rode in the men's sprint event at the 2018 UCI Track Cycling World Championships.

References

1998 births
Living people
Czech male cyclists
Place of birth missing (living people)
Cyclists at the 2019 European Games
European Games competitors for the Czech Republic